Malo Polje, which translates as Little Field in Serbo-Croatian, may refer to:

 Malo Polje, Slovenia, a village near Ajdovščina
 Malo Polje, Croatia, a village near Perušić
 Malo Polje, Mostar, a village near Mostar, Bosnia and Herzegovina
 Malo Polje (Han Pijesak), a village near Han Pijesak, Bosnia and Herzegovina